The Australian wood duck, maned duck or maned goose (Chenonetta jubata) is a dabbling duck found throughout much of Australia. It is the only living species in the genus Chenonetta. Traditionally placed in the subfamily Anatinae (dabbling ducks), it might belong to the subfamily Tadorninae (shelducks); the ringed teal may be its closest living relative.

Taxonomy
The Australian wood duck was first described by the English ornithologist John Latham in 1801 under the binomial name Anas jubata.

The flightless New Zealand species Chenonetta finschi (Finsch's duck) which was formerly believed to constitute a monotypic genus (Euryanas) has been determined to belong to Chenonetta. It became extinct before scientists could properly survey the New Zealand avifauna, but possibly as late as 1870 (based on a report of a flightless goose caught in Opotiki.)

Etymology
Chenonetta:  khēn, χηνος khēnos “goose”; νηττα nētta “duck”.
jubata:  “maned, crested”, from iuba “mane, crest”

Description
This 45–51 cm duck looks like a small goose, and mostly feeds by grazing in flocks.

The male is grey with a dark brown head and mottled breast. The female has white stripes above and below the eye and mottled underparts. Both sexes have grey wings with black primaries and a white speculum. Juveniles are similar to adult females, but lighter and with a more streaky breast.

Distribution and habitat
The Australian wood duck is widespread in Australia, including Tasmania. The Australian wood duck is found in grasslands, open woodlands, wetlands, flooded pastures and along the coast in inlets and bays. It is also common on farmland with dams, as well as around rice fields, sewage ponds and in urban parks. It will often be found around deeper lakes that may be unsuitable for other waterbirds' foraging, as it prefers to forage on land. It has been recorded as a vagrant in New Zealand, although in 2015 and 2016 a pair successfully bred there.

Behaviour

Call
The most common call is a loud, rising croaky gnow sound by the females, and the male call is the same except smoother, shorter and higher than the females. Staccato chattering is also present in flocks.

Protection
Australian wood duck is widespread in its geographic range and can be observed in a range of environments. This species has benefited from agriculture and urban developments due to the abundance of fresh water sources. In comparison to other species of Australian ducks,  the Australian Wood Duck is very common in urban areas, especially near permanent water sources such as dams, ponds, pools and irrigated grass areas such as sporting facilities, urban parks and residential nature strips.  

The Australian Wood Duck is classified as a game bird in states and territories where recreational hunting is permitted and with the exception of the Australian Capital Territory, Australian Wood Duck can be harvested throughout its geographic range by licensed hunters in all states and territories either as a pest animal or during declared recreational hunting seasons.

In Western Australia the Australian Wood Duck is a declared pest of agriculture in the South West Land Division of WA under the provisions of Section 35 the Agriculture and Related Resources Protection Act 1976 and can be legally harvested on private land between the 1st January and the 30th June, in accordance with a restricted open season notice, without the need to obtain a damage licence from the Western Australian Department of Environment and Conservation.  

In New South Wales the Australian Wood Duck along with 9 other species of Australian duck can be harvested under the NSW Native Game Bird Management Program on private property by land owners and recreational hunters who have passed the nationally recognised 'Waterfowl Identification Test' (WIT) and hold the appropriate New South Wales Game license. 

In Queensland Australian Wood Ducks along with other species of waterfowl can be harvested by under the appropriate Damage Mitigation Permit (DMP) for culling and dispersal of wildlife identified as posing a risk of damage to property or agricultural production.  

In addition to recreational and mitigation harvesting, Australian Wood Duck ('Ngawurk' in the Dja Dja Wurrung language  ) and other species of waterfowl can be harvested by traditional owners using traditional and modern methods in all states and territories. 

This species is not threatened and due to its environmental adaptability, its numbers are considered to be ascending.

Reproduction

Australian wood duck nests in cavities in trees or in nest-boxes above or near water. Nests are made with a pile of down.

Breeding
This duck nests in a tree cavity laying 9–11 cream-white eggs, similar to the Mandarin ducks. The female incubates them while the male stands guard. Once the ducklings are ready to leave the nest, the female flies to the ground and the duckling will leap to the ground and follow their parents. The males also secure their ducklings closely along with the females.

Feeding
The Australian wood duck eats grasses, grains, clover and other herbs, and occasionally, insects. It is rarely seen on open water, preferring to forage by dabbling in shallow water, or in grasslands and crops.

Similar species
The Australian wood duck can be distinguished from pygmy geese, Nettapus spp., which are smaller, have bold white face markings and are usually seen on water. Whistling ducks, Dendrocygna spp., have longer legs and necks, larger, more duck-like bills and tend to walk more upright. When flying, the Australian wood duck is the only duck with white secondary feathers and dark wingtips.

Gallery

References

 Madge, Steve & Burn, Hilary (1987): Wildfowl : an identification guide to the ducks, geese and swans of the world. Christopher Helm, London. 

Marchant, S. and Higgins, P.J. (eds). 1993. Handbook of Australian, New Zealand and Antarctic Birds. Vol 1B (Ratites to Ducks), Oxford University Press, Sydney.

Simpson, K and Day, N. (1999). Field guide to the birds of Australia, 6th Edition. Penguin Books, Australia.

Handbook of the Birds of the World vol 1 by Josep del Hoyo-Andrew Elliot-Jordi Sargatal - Lynx Edicions - 

Guide De Canards, des oies et des cygnes – de Steve Madge - Delachaux et Niestlé -

External links

 Australian Museum data sheet
 BirdLife Species Factsheet

Australian wood duck
Australian wood duck
Australian wood duck
Endemic birds of Australia
Australian wood duck
Australian wood duck
Articles containing video clips